The Lamkang people, also known as the Lamkang Naga, are a Tibeto-Burmese ethnic group predominantly inhabitanting the Northeast Indian state of Manipur, and some parts of Sagaing Region in Myanmar. They are recognised as a Scheduled Tribe (STs) by India. They share close cultural and linguistic affinity with the Anal Naga people.

References

Scheduled Tribes of Manipur
Indigenous peoples of South Asia
Ethnic groups in Myanmar
Ethnic groups in Northeast India
Ethnic groups in Manipur
Naga people